Buck Jumpin'  is an album by guitarist Al Casey which was recorded in 1960 and released on the Swingville label.

Reception

Scott Yanow of AllMusic states, "Al Casey, who will always be best known as Fats Waller's guitarist, makes one of his few appearances as a bandleader ... The music consistently swings and it is a rare pleasure to hear Casey getting the opportunity to stretch out on acoustic guitar".

Track listing
All compositions by Al Casey except where noted
 "Buck Jumpin'" – 6:11
 "Casey's Blues" – 6:38
 "Don't Blame Me" (Jimmy McHugh, Dorothy Fields) – 5:45	
 "Rosetta" (Earl Hines, Henri Woode) – 5:45
 "Ain't Misbehavin'" (Fats Waller, Andy Razaf, Harry Brooks) – 4:42
 "Honeysuckle Rose" (Waller, Razaf) – 5:32
 "Body and Soul" (Johnny Green, Frank Eyton, Edward Heyman, Robert Sour) – 5:16	
 "Gut Soul" – 3:04 Additional track on CD reissue	
 "I'm Gonna Sit Right Down and Write Myself a Letter" (Fred E. Ahlert, Joe Young) – 5:00 Additional track on CD reissue

Personnel
Al Casey – guitar
Rudy Powell – alto saxophone, clarinet  
Herman Foster – piano
Jimmy Lewis – bass
Belton Evans – drums

References

Al Casey (jazz guitarist) albums
1960 albums
Swingville Records albums
Albums recorded at Van Gelder Studio